Dr. Sin is the first studio album by Brazilian Hard rock band Dr. Sin, released in 1993 through WEA.

Track listing
All songs written by Dr. Sin, except where noted.

References

Dr. Sin albums
1993 albums